Muminjon Abdullaev (born 24 December 1989) is an Uzbekistani Greco-Roman wrestler.

Career
He who won a bronze medal at the 2010 Asian Wrestling Championships in the 96 kg division. He competed in the 120 kg event at the 2012 Summer Olympics and was eliminated in the 1/8 finals by Dremiel Byers.

Later in 2012 Abdullaev tested positive for nandrolone, an anabolic steroid, and was banned for two years until 20 November 2014.

In 2021, he competed in the men's 130 kg event at the 2020 Summer Olympics held in Tokyo, Japan.

In 2022, he won one of the bronze medals in his event at the Vehbi Emre & Hamit Kaplan Tournament held in Istanbul, Turkey. He lost his bronze medal match in the 130 kg event at the 2022 World Wrestling Championships held in Belgrade, Serbia.

References

External links

 
 
 

1989 births
Living people
People from Samarqand Region
Olympic wrestlers of Uzbekistan
Wrestlers at the 2012 Summer Olympics
Wrestlers at the 2016 Summer Olympics
Uzbekistani male sport wrestlers
Wrestlers at the 2018 Asian Games
Medalists at the 2018 Asian Games
Asian Games medalists in wrestling
Asian Games gold medalists for Uzbekistan
Islamic Solidarity Games medalists in wrestling
Islamic Solidarity Games competitors for Uzbekistan
Wrestlers at the 2020 Summer Olympics
Asian Wrestling Championships medalists
21st-century Uzbekistani people